MTI Home Video is a United States-based movie distributor in the direct-to-video market. MTI most often purchases the distribution rights to independent films and televised films that did not see a theatrical run in the U.S., for direct release to DVD.

History
MTI Home Video was founded in 1984 by music industry veteran Larry Brahms. One of the company's first releases was Freedance, an interactive fitness workout video featuring Marine Jahan from the film Flashdance.

The company was one of the first studios to successfully transfer from VHS to DVD format in 1999 by waiting until the major studios had decided upon standards before changing their business model.

MTI pioneered the sales of DVDs through alternative retailers such as dry cleaners, convenience stores and other non-traditional entertainment retail outlets in 2004.

Films
The company releases an average of forty films each year and partners with studios such as the Asylum, Artist View Entertainment, Bedford Entertainment, Delta Entertainment, Fangoria Presents, and Redrum Entertainment. Although mostly known for releasing titles in the B-movie genre such as Sharknado and Stalked at 17; MTI has a line of family-oriented films and has released other independent films such as Bloom and Nate and the Colonel.

Partial filmography
Albino Farm 
All Jokes Aside 
Americano
Attack of the Herbals 
Billy Owens and the Secret of the Runes
Black Cadillac
The Black Ninja
Bliss  
Bloom
Choker 
Con Games  
Curse of the Queerwolf 
Dark Knight 
Death on Demand 
The Eliminator 
Flight 93
Genius  
Goodbye America
Hunting Humans
I Downloaded a Ghost  
Ice Queen  
Illegal Aliens  
Kicking the Dog 
Malefactor
Marching Out of Time 
Mystery Train
The Mystical Adventures of Billy Owens
Nate and the Colonel
Never Too Late
The Newcomers 
The Other Side of the Tracks 
Pirates
A Place to Grow
Remedy 
Safehouse 
Sharknado
Slashers 
Stalked at 17
Subhuman  
The Undying
Walking the Halls

References

External links
 Company website

Film distributors of the United States